Cerithiopsis caribbaea is a species of sea snail, a gastropod in the family Cerithiopsidae. It was described by Gabb in 1881.

References

caribbaea
Gastropods described in 1881